Marie-France Pisier (10 May 194424 April 2011) was a French actress, screenwriter, and director. She appeared in numerous films of the French New Wave and twice earned the national César Award for Best Supporting Actress.

Early life
Pisier was born in Dalat, Viet Nam, where her father was serving as a colonial official in French Indochina. Her younger brother, Gilles Pisier, is a mathematician and a member of the French Academy of Sciences. Her sister, political scientist Evelyn, was the first wife of Bernard Kouchner, a French politician and the co-founder of Médecins Sans Frontières. The family moved to Paris when Marie-France was 12 years old.

Career
Five years later, Pisier made her screen acting debut for director François Truffaut in his 1962 film Antoine and Colette. She had a brief but incendiary romance with the older, married Truffaut. Despite its end, she later appeared in Truffaut's Stolen Kisses (Baisers volés, 1968) and Love on the Run (L'Amour en fuite, 1979), the fifth and final film in Truffaut's series about the character Antoine Doinel. Pisier was credited as a co-writer of the screenplay. In a review in The New York Times, film critic Vincent Canby praised her "ravishing performance".

Pisier later collaborated on the screenplay to Jacques Rivette's Celine and Julie Go Boating (Céline et Julie vont en bateau, 1974); she also played a significant supporting role in the film. Later in the same year, she had a role in Luis Buñuel's Phantom of Liberty.

Pisier gained widespread public recognition in 1975 when she appeared in Jean-Charles Tacchella's popular comedy Cousin Cousine. Her role as the volatile Karine earned her a César Award for Best Supporting Actress. Her subsequent feature films included three with director André Téchiné: French Provincial (Souvenirs en France, 1975); The Bronte Sisters (Les sœurs Brontë, 1979), in which she portrayed Charlotte; and Barocco (1976), for which she won a second César for her performance alongside Isabelle Adjani and Gérard Depardieu.

Pisier attempted to crack the American film industry with The Other Side of Midnight (1977), adapted from a Sidney Sheldon novel. She appeared on American television in the miniseries The French Atlantic Affair (1979), and Scruples the next year. She made two more Hollywood films, French Postcards (1979) with Debra Winger and Chanel Solitaire (1981) with Timothy Dalton.

Returning to France, Pisier made her directorial debut with The Governor's Party (Le bal du gouverneur, 1990), which she adapted from her own novel. She also played Madame Verdurin in Raúl Ruiz's adaptation of Marcel Proust, Time Regained (Le temps retrouvé, 1999). Her final film as director was with Bérénice Bejo (winner of the César Award for Best Actress in The Artist) in Like An Airplane (Comme un avion, 2002).

Personal life

Pisier's first marriage to Georges Kiejman ended in divorce. She resided in Saint-Cyr-sur-Mer, Var, and was married to Thierry Funck-Brentano. The couple had a son, Mathieu, and a daughter, Iris.

In 1971, Pisier signed the Manifesto of the 343, publicly declaring she had an illegal abortion.

Death
Pisier died on 24 April 2011, aged 66. She was found dead in her swimming pool by Funck-Brentano and is believed to have drowned. She was survived by her sister Évelyne, brother Gilles, and both children. The local mayor announced her death to the news media and President Nicolas Sarkozy made a public statement honouring "her supreme elegance born of the most perfect simplicity".

Filmography

Actress

Filmmaker

Theater

Author

References

External links

 
 

1944 births
2011 deaths
Deaths by drowning in France
French film actresses
French women screenwriters
French screenwriters
Accidental deaths in France
Best Supporting Actress César Award winners
20th-century French actresses
21st-century French actresses
Signatories of the 1971 Manifesto of the 343